Pakhtakor may refer to:

FC Pakhtakor Tashkent - an Uzbek football club
Paxtakor - a city in Uzbekistan

Several places in Tajikistan:

Pakhtakor, Sughd
Pakhtakor, Khatlon